Osceola is an unincorporated community in Tangipahoa Parish, Louisiana, United States. The community is located   NW of Covington, Louisiana.

Ella B. Hughes wrote that in 1888 a post office was built in Husser, Louisiana and just a few years later a second post office was built a few miles to the south and was called Viola. The area was renamed Osceola just a few years later.

Etymology
The name of the community is derived from an ancient native american ritual dating back to the Archaic period. The Muscogee people would perform a ritual they called ássi which means black drink and yahola which means "shouting man" or "singer". There was also a very influential leader of the Seminole people from Florida named Osceola that was given this name.

References

Unincorporated communities in Tangipahoa Parish, Louisiana
Unincorporated communities in Louisiana